The Dr. Frank W. Epley Office is located in New Richmond, Wisconsin. It was added to the National Register of Historic Places in 1988.

It is a one-and-a-half-story T-shaped plan house with wood shingles.

It was associated with Dr. Frank W. Epley (1851-1908).

References

Houses in St. Croix County, Wisconsin
Hospital buildings on the National Register of Historic Places in Wisconsin
Houses completed in 1884
National Register of Historic Places in St. Croix County, Wisconsin
1884 establishments in Wisconsin